Yasir Arafat Satti (born 12 March 1982) is a Pakistani cricket coach and former international cricketer, an all-rounder who batted right-handed and bowled right-arm fast.

Cricket career

International career
Having previously represented his country at Under-15 level, he made his ODI debut for Pakistan in 2000 when he was 17 years old against Sri Lanka in Karachi and took his first wicket in this match. He played just one more match the following year before being dropped.  He was given a second chance at international cricket in the last ODI against England in December 2005 and was retained for the series against India in February 2006, but was left out of the ODI squad for the subsequent tour in England.  His next chance at international cricket came in the 2006 ICC Champions Trophy when he was one of the players called up to the Pakistan squad for the Champions Trophy to replace Shoaib Akhtar and Mohammad Asif who had both failed drug tests.

In March 2007, he and Mohammad Sami were called up as replacements in Pakistan's squad for the 2007 Cricket World Cup after Shoaib Akhtar and Mohammad Asif were ruled out through injury.

On 8 December 2007, Arafat made his Test match debut for Pakistan against India in Bangalore in the third and final Test of the series. He displayed his all-round abilities by taking 7 wickets in the match including a 5-wicket haul, and scoring 44 in the first innings.

He was part of Pakistan squad for 2009 ICC World Twenty20 but he was later replaced due to hamstring injury.

Domestic and T20 franchise career
In English domestic cricket, he was signed as an overseas player for Scotland as a replacement for Rahul Dravid, and played for them in the 2004 and 2005 seasons. He was signed as an overseas player for Sussex for the 2006 season to line-up alongside fellow countrymen Mushtaq Ahmed and Rana Naved-ul-Hasan, and helped the team to win the double of the County Championship and the C&G Trophy as well as mount a serious challenge in the Pro40 League. He was signed up to play for Kent in the 2007 season.

In 2004, Arafat performed the extremely rare feat of taking five wickets in six balls for Rawalpindi against the national champions Faisalabad in the Quaid-e-Azam Trophy. This had only been achieved three times previously in the entire history of first-class cricket: by Bill Copson in 1937, William Henderson in 1938 and Pat Pocock in 1972. Arafat was the only bowler to take the wickets spread over two innings.

In August 2008, it was reported that he was signed by Kolkata Knight Riders to play in the second season of the Indian Premier League tournament but the deal wasn't finalized due to tense atmosphere between India Pakistan after the 2008 Mumbai attacks.

Following the 2008 season, Arafat signed once more for Sussex as their overseas player for 2009, signing to return again for another season in 2010. In 2011 he signed for Surrey County Cricket Club. He joined Lancashire as an overseas player for the 2012 Friends Life t20.

In November 2011, he was signed by Canterbury to play in the 2011–12 HRV Cup.

Arafat was signed to play in Big Bash League franchise Perth Scorchers in December 2013. In 2016, he was signed by Somerset from Hampshire on a season-long loan deal as a non-overseas player.

Coaching career
Moving to England after his retirement, where he took permanent residence, he coached teams at junior level while in 2023 he became the first former Test cricketer from Pakistan to complete the England and Wales Cricket Board (ECB) level 4 coaching course.

He coached Surrey CCC as a bowling consultant in 2011 and later in 2022.

See also
 List of Pakistan cricketers who have taken five-wicket hauls on Test debut

References

External links
 

1982 births
Living people
Pakistan Test cricketers
Pakistan One Day International cricketers
Pakistan Twenty20 International cricketers
Pakistani cricketers
Pakistani cricket coaches
People from Rawalpindi District
Punjabi people
Cricketers at the 2007 Cricket World Cup
Rawalpindi cricketers
Khan Research Laboratories cricketers
Redco Pakistan Limited cricketers
Scotland cricketers
Sussex cricketers
Kent cricketers
Otago cricketers
Canterbury cricketers
Cricketers who have taken five wickets on Test debut
Lancashire cricketers
Somerset cricketers
Surrey cricketers
Fortune Barishal cricketers
Dolphins cricketers
National Bank of Pakistan cricketers
Perth Scorchers cricketers
Hampshire cricketers
Marylebone Cricket Club cricketers